Toroidal describes something which resembles or relates to a torus or toroid:

Mathematics
Torus
Toroid, a surface of revolution which resembles a torus
Toroidal polyhedron
Toroidal coordinates, a three-dimensional orthogonal coordinate system
Toroidal and poloidal coordinates, directions relative to a torus of reference
Toroidal graph, a graph whose vertices can be placed on a torus such that no edges cross
Toroidal grid network, where an n-dimensional grid network is connected circularly in more than one dimension

Engineering
Toroidal inductors and transformers, a type of electrical device
Toroidal and poloidal, directions in magnetohydrodynamics
Toroidal engine, an internal combustion engine with pistons that rotate within a toroidal space
Toroidal CVT, a type of continuously variable transmission
Toroidal reflector, a parabolic reflector which has a different focal distance depending on the angle of the mirror

Other uses
Toroidal ring model in theoretical physics
Vortex ring, also known as a toroidal vortex; a toroidal flow in fluid mechanics

See also
Atoroidal
Torus (disambiguation)